For God and Country is the debut album by the Santa Cruz, California-based hardcore punk band Good Riddance, released February 7, 1995 through Fat Wreck Chords.

Reception 
Andy Hinds of Allmusic called For God and Country "quite a mature and focused debut, thanks largely to the leadership of singer Russ Rankin, whose deep personal convictions give the band an intelligently idealistic variation on SoCal punk ... Musically, the band are typical of most Fat Wreck and Epitaph groups (they seem to have learned most of their tricks from the tremendously influential Bad Religion), but the group's heartfelt message gives their music a resonating power that lifts them above their contemporaries."

Track listing

Personnel 

 Russ Rankin – vocals
 Luke Pabich – guitar, backing vocals
 Chuck Platt – bass guitar, backing vocals
 Rich McDermott – drums
 Fat Mike – producer
 Ryan Greene – producer, recording engineer, mix engineer

References

External links 
For God and Country at Fat Wreck Chords

Good Riddance (band) albums
1995 debut albums
Fat Wreck Chords albums
Albums produced by Ryan Greene